Rockface is a British television drama series, principally written and created by Nicholas Hicks-Beach and Shelley Miller, that first broadcast on BBC One on 13 March 2002. The series, set in Glenntannoch, a fictitious town in the Scottish Highlands, centres on a mountain rescue team led by Dr. Gordon Urquhart (Clive Russell). The major rescues and incidents featured within the series were based upon real life rescues conducted by the Lochaber Mountain Rescue service. Prior to filming, the cast underwent training to gather knowledge of the skills required to become a real-life mountain rescue team, under the guidance of trainer Mick Tighe.

Rockface ran for two series; the first series of six episodes broadcasting in 2002 on Wednesday evenings; with a second series of eight episodes following in 2003 on Sunday evenings. Strong critical reception and reasonable viewing figures lead to a second series being commissioned before the first had finished broadcasting. The final episode was broadcast on 27 July 2003. Notably, despite being listed for release, the series has never been made available on DVD. An interactive website, including games based upon the series as well as cast profiles and computer wallpapers and screensavers, was launched online shortly before the series' television debut.

Production
Prior to filming, the cast undertook several days of mountain rescue training, under the guidance of trainer Mick Tighe. Tighe said of the cast; "Getting raw recruits is not alien to me, but they did very well, I was very impressed with them." Clive Russell commented; "All of us who underwent that training together developed a really strong bond. What we learned about ourselves and each other will never go away." Cal MacAninch added; "Mick put us all through our paces. His military background was familiar to me through the work I did filming Warriors, so I was used to that attitude and sense of humour. I loved his drive and his determination was very inspiring – even when he picked on me as I struggled up a hill. What he taught us all was to keep going and stop moaning – that has helped me in everything I do – especially on film sets."

Real-life Search and Rescue helicopters and crew were used for external shots.  Crew and helicopters from the Royal Navy's HMS GANNET Search and Rescue Flight based at Prestwick airport, Ayrshire.  On a number of occasions, filming of certain sequences were interrupted by the aircraft being called away on real "shouts".

Cast
 Clive Russell as Dr Gordon Urquhart
 Brendan Coyle as Douglas McLanaghan
 Cal MacAninch as Ben Craig
 Richard Graham as Mike Bayliss
 Zoë Eeles as Annie Craig
 Melanie Gutteridge as Caroline Morrison
 Jamie Sives as PC Peter Craig
 Rupert Evans as Jamie Doughan
 Kenneth Bryans as Danny Tunick
 Louise Goodall as WPC Betty Farinelli
 Kim Vithana as Nurse Helen
 Jan Harvey as Dr. Jane Chamberlain
 Barbara Rafferty as Alice Urquhart

Episodes

Series 1 (2002)

Series 2 (2003)

References

External links

BBC Scotland television shows
BBC television dramas
Television shows set in Scotland
2000s British drama television series
2002 British television series debuts
2003 British television series endings
Television series by Sony Pictures Television
English-language television shows